Bohemians Praha 1905 (previously named FC Bohemians Praha) is a Prague-based football club, which was founded in 1905 as AFK Vršovice. The club won the 1982–83 Czechoslovak First League, its only league championship. Its colours are green and white.

The best known player from Bohemians' history is Antonín Panenka, who is now the club chairman. Bohemians' mascot is a kangaroo, the legacy of a 1927 tour of Australia. Following the tour, the club was awarded two live kangaroos, which they donated to the Prague Zoo.

History
Founded as AFK Vršovice, the club played at the top level of football in the Czechoslovak First League between 1925 and 1935. They spent seasons in and out of the top division for the next 40 years before remaining in the top flight between 1973 and 1995, the most successful era for the club. In the 1982–83 season the club won the Czechoslovak First League and advanced to the semi-finals of the UEFA Cup. In the year 2005 it survived a crisis, which was a consequence of bad management. The club was prevented from taking part in the second part of the 2004–05 Czech 2. Liga and its results were expunged. The club was relegated to the 3rd Czech division due to its financial insolvency, but later was saved by its fans who paid off a portion of the club's debts.

The club finished third in the 2005–06 Bohemian Football League, missing out on promotion, but advanced to the Second League regardless, as they bought a license to play in the Second League from SC Xaverov. The club was then able to advance back to the top flight in 2007, where they played until relegation in 2012. After only one season in 2. Liga Bohemians returned to the First League in 2013.

Historical names
 1905: AFK Vršovice
 1927: Bohemians AFK Vršovice
 1941: Bohemia AFK Vršovice
 1945: Bohemians AFK Vršovice
 1948: Sokol Vršovice Bohemians
 1949: Sokol Železničaři Bohemians Praha
 1950: Sokol Železničaři Praha
 1951: Sokol ČKD Stalingrad Praha
 1953: Spartak Praha Stalingrad
 1962: ČKD Praha
 1965: Bohemians ČKD Praha
 1993: Bohemians Praha
 1999: CU Bohemians Praha
 2001: FC Bohemians Praha
 2005: Bohemians 1905
 2013: Bohemians Praha 1905

Australia Tour
In 1927 Australian football officials were looking for a European football club to come and tour. They decided on Czechoslovakia and approached Slavia Prague and Viktoria Žižkov who both declined. AFK Vršovice took up the offer.

Before leaving the team looked for a suitable name as they felt the Australians would not know where Vršovice was, never mind say it. They decided on Bohemians, taking the English spelling of the name, as it resembled the country they were from.

Matches played

 4:2   British Army XI Colombo, Ceylon (Now Sri Lanka)
 11:3  Western Australia, Perth
 6:4  Western Australia, Perth
 11:1  South Australia, Adelaide
 2:1  Australia Repr. XI, Adelaide
 1:0  Victoria Melbourne, Melbourne
 4:1  Australia Repr. XI, Melbourne
 9:0  Wagga-Wagga XI, Wagga Wagga
 4:5  New South Wales, Sydney
 2:1  Illawara District, Wollongong
 4:3  New South Wales XI, Newcastle
 6:4  Australia, Sydney
 2:3  Australia, Brisbane
 5:5  Australia, Brisbane
 1:3  Maitland, Maitland
 5:3  Queensland, Ipswich
 5:3  Metropolis, Sydney
 4:4  Australia, Sydney
 3:2  Western Australia, Perth

Naming dispute with FK Bohemians

In 1993, Bohemians 1905 broke away from the TJ Bohemians Praha sports franchise and became a separate legal entity.  The club functioned normally until financial troubles came up and the club nearly collapsed in 2005.  TJ Bohemians took advantage of the situation and rented out the Bohemians logo to FC Střížkov Praha 9, a lowly team in the third tier of Czech football.  TJ were able to pour money into the small club and help them rise to the first division.  However, fans remained loyal to the Bohemians 1905 team, and helped the large club to recover.

In September 2012, a Czech court ruled that the former Střížkov club must not continue to use the name Bohemians after 31 January 2013. However, in December 2012, the club was granted the right to appeal against the decision, thus protracting the process yet further.

In 2016, Střížkov's men's team was dissolved, and in 2017 the whole club dissolved, with the women's team becoming FC Praha.

Stadium

The home stadium, located in Vršovice, is called Ďolíček. However, from the 2010–11 season, for a period of five years, Bohemians undertook to play its home matches at Synot Tip Arena. This arrangement was discontinued in 2012 after the club was relegated from the Czech First League, due to the regulations on stadiums being different between the two leagues.

Kits

Supporters and rivalries

Bohemians are one of the most popular clubs in the Czech Republic. The club is one of the few in the country to have fans with a left-wing ideology, although most fan groups identify themselves as apolitical, and there are supporters who are right-wing. The ultras group is one of the strongest in terms of choreographies and visual displays in the country. They maintain friendly contacts with Dubliners Bohemian FC,. Left-wing fans have friendship with FC St. Pauli and AS Trenčín. Right-wing fans have friendship with Górnik Wałbrzych, 1. FC Lokomotive Leipzig and hooligans with FK Pardubice.

There have been several conflicts in the past between left-wing and right-wing fans. The most famous are the fights in 2013 in match against FC MAS Táborsko and in 2015 in the match against SK Sigma Olomouc.

The most prestigious match is the derby with Slavia Prague. The "Vršovice Derby" is the second most prestigious derby in Prague (after the Slavia-Sparta derby). Slavia and Bohemians are located in the Vršovice district of Prague and their stadiums are separated by only 1 km. Sparta Prague are considered their biggest rivals, and Viktoria Zizkov is the other team with whom they contest the city derbies. FK Bohemians Prague (Střížkov) were considered to be impostors and the entire club as a fraud, however that rivalry manifested itself on the pitch and towards the club management as the Střížkov club had very little support and no organised fan movement.

Players

Current squad

Out on loan

Notable former players

Reserves
As of 2019/20, the club's reserve team Bohemians 1905 B plays in the Bohemian Football League (3rd tier of Czech football system). They play their home matches at the club's stadium, Ďolíček.

Player records in the Czech First League
.
Highlighted players are in the current squad.

Most appearances

Most goals

Most clean sheets

Management and technical staff

Managers and players

Head coaches in club's history

1934 Karel Meduna
1940 Ladislav Ženíšek
1945 Antonín Lanhaus
1972 Bohumil Musil
1977 Tomáš Pospíchal
1983 Josef Zadina
1983 Jiří Rubáš
1983 Tomáš Pospíchal
1987 Michal Jelínek
1987 Dušan Uhrin
1988 Josef Zadina
1989 Josef Ledecký
1991 Josef Hloušek
1993 Petr Packert
1994 Mario Buzek
1994 František Barát
1995 Svatopluk Bouška
1995 Dalibor Lacina
1996 Josef Hloušek
1996 Miloš Beznoska and Antonín Panenka (caretakers)
1996 Vladimír Borovička (caretaker)
1996 Vlastimil Petržela
2002 Vladimír Borovička (caretaker)
2002 Dušan Uhrin, Jr.
2005 Zbyněk Busta
2008 Pavel Hoftych
2011 Pavel Medynský
2012 Jozef Weber
2014 Luděk Klusáček
2014 Roman Pivarník
2016 Miroslav Koubek
2017 Martin Hašek
2019 Luděk Klusáček
2022 Jaroslav Veselý

Club hall of fame

 Karel Bejbl
 Přemysl Bičovský
 Milan Čermák
 Karol Dobiáš
 Jaroslav Kamenický
 Antonín Panenka
 Tomáš Pospíchal
 Jiří Rubáš
 Dalibor Slezák
 Radek Sňozík

History in domestic competitions

 Seasons spent at Level 1 of the football league system: 19
 Seasons spent at Level 2 of the football league system: 8
 Seasons spent at Level 3 of the football league system: 1
 Seasons spent at Level 4 of the football league system: 0

Czech Republic

Notes:
† results expunged

History in European competitions

UEFA Cup (1975/76)

UEFA Cup (1979/80)

UEFA Cup (1980/81)

UEFA Cup (1981/82)

UEFA Cup (1982/83)

European Champions' Cup (1983/84)

UEFA Cup (1984/85)

UEFA Cup (1985/86)

UEFA Cup (1987/88)

Club records

Czech First League records
Best position: 4th (2001–02)
Worst position: 16th (1996–97)
Biggest home win: Bohemians 4–0 Blšany (2000–01), Bohemians 4–0 Teplice (2019–20), Bohemians 4–0 Mladá Boleslav (2020–21)
Biggest away win: Příbram 1–5 Bohemians (2001–02)
Biggest home defeat: Bohemians 0–4 Žižkov (1994–95), Bohemians 0–4 Ostrava (2001–02), Bohemians 0–4 Sparta Prague (2011–12)
Biggest away defeat: Drnovice 6–0 Bohemians (1996–97)

Honours
Czechoslovak First League (first tier)
 Champions (1): 1982–83
 Runners-up (1): 1984–85
Czechoslovak Cup
 Runners-up (1): 1982
Czech Cup (as part of the Czechoslovak Cup)
 Champions (1): 1982

References

External links
 

English Language Supporters' website

 
Football clubs in the Czech Republic
Football clubs in Prague
Association football clubs established in 1905
Czechoslovak First League clubs
Czech First League clubs
Fan-owned football clubs
Football clubs in Czechoslovakia
1905 establishments in Austria-Hungary